Route 24 Business or Highway 24 Business may refer to:

  Interstate 24 Business
  U.S. Route 24 Business
  Georgia State Route 24 Business (disambiguation)
  Maine State Route 24 Business
  M-24 Business (Michigan highway)
  North Carolina Highway 24 Business

See also
List of highways numbered 24
List of highways numbered 24A